"House of M" is a 2005 comic book storyline published by Marvel Comics, consisting of a core eight-issue comic book limited series written by Brian Michael Bendis and illustrated by Olivier Coipel and a number of crossover tie-in books. Its first issue appeared in June 2005 as a follow-up to the events of the Planet X and Avengers Disassembled storylines, in which the superhero Scarlet Witch suffered a mental breakdown and tried to alter the fabric of reality to recreate her lost children. Magneto, the Scarlet Witch, and her twin brother, Quicksilver, play major roles in the series. Like the (1995–1996) Age of Apocalypse storyline, House of M replaced the Earth-616 as the main reality for a brief time until Scarlet Witch reverted it to normal. The events of the storyline were later indicated to have occurred on Earth-58163.

Publication history
The first issue was released in June 2005, with the series concluding in November 2005. The first two issues were ranked first and second in sales in the June 2005 period, with the first issue selling over 233,000 copies. The final issue, House of M #8, ranked third in sales for the November 2005 period with sales of 135,462. In addition to the main eight-issue limited series, House of M was preceded by a story in Excalibur #13–14, and had several tie-ins to ongoing series, including Uncanny X-Men, New X-Men: Academy X, The Incredible Hulk and Wolverine, and several miniseries: Fantastic Four: House of M, Iron-Man: House of M, Mutopia X: House of M, and Spider-Man: House of M.

Bendis, the lead writer for the House of M event, stated that the series would "shake the world and break the Internet wide open." Before the event, Bendis also mentioned in several interviews that the event would have a lasting effect on the Marvel Universe, but remained tight-lipped as to what.

The crossover was followed by a one-shot called House of M: Decimation – The Day After, a series called Son of M that depicts Quicksilver dealing with his loss of powers, and Generation M, which devoted each issue to a different mutant dealing with the loss of their powers. Characters who appeared include Chamber, Jubilee, and Blob. Characters who lost their powers included Dani Moonstar, Magneto, and Tag. The storyline also led to the reboot of Excalibur into New Excalibur, a shift in the creative teams of several comics, and the debut of several spin-off series, including X-Men: Deadly Genesis, X-Men: The 198, Sentinel Squad O*N*E, Ms. Marvel, and a new X-Factor series.

The epilogue to the House of M and Decimation story-lines, served to answer the mystery of the strange "energy-cloud" hovering in orbit around the Earth after House of M #8, was revealed in the pages of New Avengers #16–20

World

In this world, Magneto was attacked by Sentinels in Manhattan in 1979 (taking advantage of Marvel's sliding timescale policy, no heroes were active in the 1970s). At the end of the attack, Magneto revealed an alleged international anti-mutant conspiracy involving Richard M. Nixon. As a result, Magneto was granted sovereignty of the island of Genosha as the leader of the world's mutants. Another result was that the protection of mutant life was judged to be the first worry of all laws (as a result, stem cell research on mutant embryos is illegal, but stem cell research on altered human embryos is permitted). Because of this, the world is a racist society, with mutants controlling governments, businesses, and culture, and humans (or "sapiens") are looked down on as inferior (essentially a reversal of the status quo in the mainstream Marvel Universe, where mutants are looked down on and despised instead).

Some exceptions apply to "sapiens" who live with privileges like Carol Danvers (Ms. Marvel in Earth-616 continuity, but Captain Marvel in the World of M) and Peter Parker (Spider-Man). Danvers is widely known to be a "sapiens," while Spider-Man is believed by the House of M world at large to be a mutant.

Given that the House of M reality was created by the Scarlet Witch and Charles Xavier, combining their powers to give the assembled New Avengers and X-Men their hearts' desires, it appears that Magneto's heart desire was threefold. Primarily, he wanted the entire world to acknowledge that his paranoid fantasies about baseline humans wanting to exterminate mutants were true (hence the Sentinel attack over New York in 1979, which concluded with the release of evidence that the world's human leaders were involved in a genocidal anti-mutant conspiracy). Secondly, he wanted to be acknowledged as a heroic figure and the rightful leader of all mutant-kind (hence the disappearance of Charles Xavier and the timing of Magneto's rise to dominance before other superheroes had appeared on the scene to challenge him). And thirdly, a massive speeding-up of the natural evolution of Homo sapiens into Homo superior; until, by the modern era, they accounted for almost 50% of the global population, providing him with a power base sufficient to take over the governments of the world and use them to oppress baseline humans.

It is unclear whether the Scarlet Witch altered the entire Marvel Universe, or merely the structure and history of Earth, a fact further complicated by the events of Secret Invasion. The Skrull Hank Pym stated there was no way the Skrull army could win against such a vast number of mutants, at least possibly implying that the Skrull army was left intact by Wanda's reality warp. Also, Xavier's supposed death in this reality, which conflicts with his reported off-planet actions, further confuses the issue. There is a Kree ambassador called Genis-Vell that appears within this illusory reality, and the Kree are shown to be peacefully collaborating with Earth, indicating that such was the Scarlet Witch's power that she was indeed capable of rewriting all of reality, the entire universe.

The universe where House of M takes place is designated as Earth-58163.

Synopsis

Genesis

Wanda Maximoff, also known as the Scarlet Witch, is living on the devastated island of Genosha under the care of Professor Charles Xavier and her father (at the time) Magneto. Professor X informs Magneto that his telepathic powers will no longer be enough to hold back Wanda's reality-warping abilities and that a permanent solution must be found. Magneto blames himself for twisting his children through the strength of his own dreams and ambitions.

Meanwhile, Xavier arranges a meeting of the Avengers, the X-Men and several lone heroes to Avengers Tower to decide the fate of Wanda Maximoff. Emma Frost concludes that killing Wanda is the only way to end her destructive magic. Captain America argues that the group should seek alternate methods of dealing with Wanda, including suppression of her powers and her insanity. The X-Men argue that if word gets out that a mutant with the ability to change reality went insane, it would "send human-mutant relations back to the stone age." As the conversation progresses, it is revealed that Professor X asked Doctor Strange to help Wanda, but unfortunately neither was strong enough to combat her magic. Wolverine speaks up, saying that there is no other way—Wanda must be killed. The rest of the group decides that they must talk to Wanda in person before making their decision.

Back in Genosha, a distraught Quicksilver rushes to Magneto and reveals that he was just in New York City where he heard that the X-Men and Avengers are planning on killing Wanda. Magneto does not know what to do and, clearly upset, asks: "What would you have me do?" Quicksilver falls to the floor, sobbing, and Magneto glances over at his sleeping daughter.

Xavier takes the two groups to Genosha, only to discover that Wanda is missing. Suddenly, the members of the group start to disappear one by one. Spider-Man is soon the only one left and becomes engulfed by a white light.

New world 
When the light departs, the world has changed: Spider-Man is a celebrity married to Gwen Stacy; Cyclops and Emma Frost are married; Doctor Strange is a psychologist; Carol Danvers is Captain Marvel, America's most beloved superhero; Gambit is a criminal; and Steve Rogers is an aged veteran. As the vignettes of their lives are followed, it becomes readily apparent that none of them remembers the change. Wolverine recalls all of his lost memories and knows this new world is a lie. He finds the world has changed into one where Homo superior is the dominant species instead of Homo sapiens. Mutants rule humans—and Magneto and his "House of M" rule mutants.

Wolverine seeks help from his fellow X-Men and Avengers. Unable to find Professor X, Wolverine goes looking for Spider-Man and Tony Stark. He is confronted by his "teammates" in the Red Guard, elite mutant soldiers of S.H.I.E.L.D. Wolverine escapes and finds the Human Resistance Movement led by Luke Cage. Cage has gathered other non-mutant crime-fighters to protect humans from the House of M's abuses of power. Wolverine is shocked to see one of the members is Clint Barton (Hawkeye), a hero who had died in the real world.

Wolverine explains why he knows this world was created by the Scarlet Witch. He theorizes Magneto used her to create a world where everyone's deepest wish was granted. Magneto got the mutant supremacy he always wanted. Spider-Man got a life of happiness and contentment. Wolverine is an Agent of S.H.I.E.L.D. but remembers the world from before 'House of M'. Cage reveals that a little girl named Layla Miller told him almost exactly the same thing days ago. The heroes begin visiting the Avengers and X-Men in their new lives as Layla awakens their true memories.

Wake-up call
Wolverine and the Human Resistance awaken many heroes to the truth, including Cyclops, Spider-Man, Shadowcat, Doctor Strange, Iron Man, She-Hulk, Daredevil, Rogue, Mystique, Nightcrawler, Toad, and Spider-Woman. Hawkeye becomes distraught over learning of his death and briefly leaves the group. The rest travel to Genosha for a final confrontation with Magneto.

Back in Genosha, Magneto receives representatives from around the world to commemorate the mutant triumph over humanity. The heroes attack Magneto and his family directly, while Cloak, Emma Frost, Doctor Strange, and Layla search for Xavier. They find a gravestone with Xavier's name, but Cloak discovers nobody buried beneath it.

Battle Against House of M
The battle between the House of M and the heroes continues with great ferocity. While the chaos ensues, the Scarlet Witch disappears from the battlefield only to be discovered by Doctor Strange in a tower with her children. The two begin to talk as Doctor Strange attempts to discover the origin of the madness that is happening. Wanda reveals the answer to him in a flashback from when Quicksilver confronted Magneto about the fate of Wanda. It turns out that Quicksilver himself was the one responsible for the creation of the alternate world, suggesting to Wanda to make everyone happy in an almost-perfect world. After this revelation, Emma Frost tells Doctor Strange to ask about the fate of Charles Xavier. Before she can answer, Wanda is struck in the back by an arrow.

The attacker is Hawkeye, who begins to break down emotionally to Wanda about his death in the real timeline. After a heated exchange, Hawkeye is killed for the second time as one of the Scarlet Witch's antagonized sons uses his mutant powers to "erase" the Avenger. Meanwhile, in the memorial garden, Magneto confronts Emma Frost and Layla Miller, who reveal the truth to Magneto about all that has happened. He then unleashes his wrath on everyone, especially his son Quicksilver. He kills Quicksilver by pummeling him to a bloody pulp with large pieces of steel. Suddenly, the Scarlet Witch appears and returns her brother to life. She begins to lash out, saying "We're freaks, Mutants... You chose this over us and you ruined us... Daddy!" She then utters "No more mutants." Everything turns to white once again.

No More Mutants
In a blinding flash, the world seemingly returns to normal. The Avengers come together to try to make sense of what happened that night, only to be confronted by a distraught Doctor Strange, who states that the "House of M" timeline really took place, and its effects are slowly being felt on a wider scale. They later get an alert from the ruins of Avengers Mansion. Investigating, they find Hawkeye's uniform pinned to a wall with his arrows, suggesting Hawkeye is alive.

At the Xavier Institute for Higher Learning, most of the students lose their mutant abilities. Emma Frost scans the whole world with Cerebro for mutant activity. She learns the number of mutants in the world has dropped from millions to a few hundred. Spider-Man is distraught and angry with the fact that he still has memories of being married to Gwen Stacy and having a child together. Meanwhile, Wolverine awakens remembering everything about his past. The X-Men fly to Genosha looking for Magneto and his children. They find Magneto is also powerless and does not know where Wanda or Quicksilver have gone.

The heroes can only guess what has caused the majority of the mutant population to lose their powers. Xavier is still missing, and Cerebro and Doctor Strange are unable to detect the Scarlet Witch. Hank Pym warns that all these powers could not simply vanish, but are contained somewhere and that because every action has an equal and opposite reaction, the question remains as to what the reaction to these events will be. A colossal red ribbon of energy begins to orbit Earth.

"Decimation"

The "House of M" storyline resulted in the reduction of the mutant population from millions to hundreds. Only two current members of the X-Men (Polaris and Professor X) suffered this fate, as well as the former X-Man Chamber. Several minor allies and enemies were depowered, including Callisto and the Blob, the longest-running character to be affected. Although their main adversary, Magneto, also lost his abilities, as have two members of the Avengers, Quicksilver and Scarlet Witch. Magneto and Xavier have since been repowered, whilst Polaris and Quicksilver (and others) have either gained new powers (sometimes almost exactly like their old powers) or regained lost powers by other means, within a span of well under two years. Other reasonably popular mutants have also been repowered by technology, such as Wind Dancer and Jubilee. 

Other consequences include:

 The temporary disappearance of Charles Xavier (he returned in X-Men: Deadly Genesis without his powers), Scarlet Witch, and Quicksilver. Quicksilver's disappearance is explained in the Son of M limited series.
 Wolverine's total recall of his past, which caused a serious change in his status. Multiple governments and agencies for which he has worked or which have manipulated him consider him to be one of the most dangerous threats to them.
 Though not explicitly expressed in the House of M series, as of New Avengers #26, Clint Barton has been revived in the Marvel Universe.
 The Collective, a new villain that destroyed the Canadian superhero team Alpha Flight, was created as a result of the decimation event. The Collective was apparently formed from all of the mutant energies displaced by Wanda's actions.
 The Shadow King was able to return to this reality with Shadow-X when Wanda shifted reality.
 Onslaught was reborn.
 Jim Jaspers was brought back to life and fused with The Fury.
 The disappearance of Meggan and return of Captain Britain to the United Kingdom as a result of preventing the destruction of all realities from the strain of the House of M rewriting the Earth-616 reality; later Meggan was reportedly taken prisoner by a demon named Plokta. Finally, she managed to free herself, reuniting with Captain Britain.
 Due to the vast depowering of mutants, America won the super powers war without lifting a finger.
 The Skrulls gained a massive advantage in their infiltration and sabotage. With so many millions of mutants killed, lost, or powerless, one of the three primary threats Veranke stated was neutralized.
 With all the mutant energy released, Vulcan, the third Summers brother, was revived from a long slumber.
 Illyana Rasputin was reborn as Darkchylde.

Worlds Tour
The Exiles begin their Worlds Tour in Exiles #69 to chase down Proteus who has been reborn in this new world. It was their first stop of six.

"Secret Invasion"
In a May 5, 2008, interview, Brian Michael Bendis indicated that the events of "House of M" play into the "Secret Invasion" storyline. The activities of the Skrulls during House of M were covered in New Avengers #45, in which it was revealed that the Skrull agents were able to retain their memories after Wanda alters reality, her powers seemingly unable to detect their true natures and desires, and had attempted to instigate the destruction of the mutants over the alteration. The Skrull queen, still disguised as Jessica Drew, considered the resulting "Decimation" to be a boon to the Skrull's plans as they could now divert the part of their forces intended to deal with Earth's mutant population to other areas.

Later miniseries

House of M: Avengers
The five-issue limited series House of M: Avengers debuted in November 2007, written by Christos Gage and drawn by Mike Perkins. The series spans from 1979 to the present day and acts as a prequel to the original House of M miniseries, showing the formation of Luke Cage's Human Resistance Movement.

Civil War: House of M
The 2008 miniseries Civil War: House of M depicts how Magneto took over the world and made mutants the dominant race, as well as confirming that Xavier is indeed dead in this reality. It also features House of M versions of Bolivar Trask, Bucky Barnes, Burner, Dragoness, Gateway, Graydon Creed, Lifter, Mimic, Nuke, Randall Darby, Slither, the Soviet Super-Soldiers (Crimson Dynamo, Darkstar, Red Guardian, Titanium Man, Ursa Major, Vanguard), Vashti Cleito-Son, and Warlord Krang.

House of M: Masters of Evil
Set right after Civil War: House of M, this miniseries depicts how the Hood assembles a gang of the deadliest "sapiens" super-criminals: Madame Masque, Absorbing Man, Batroc the Leaper, Blizzard II, Chemistro III, Cobra, Constrictor, Crossbones, Nitro, Sandman, Titania, Wizard, and the Wrecking Crew (Bulldozer, Piledriver, Thunderball, and Wrecker).

"Spider-Verse"
In the run-up to the 2014 "Spider-Verse" storyline, the Superior Spider-Man (Doctor Octopus's mind in Spider-Man's body) found himself temporarily trapped in the year 2099 with his attempts to return home via a dimensional portal resulting in him witnessing various alternate worlds where other Spider-Men had been killed by a dimension-hopping adversary including a dead Spider-Man in what appeared to be the world of the House of M.

Secret Wars (2015)
The "House of M" timeline appeared in the 2015 storyline "Secret Wars". Its location on Battleworld is called the Monarchy of M.

Comic tie-ins
The "House of M" storyline ties into the following comics:

 Black Panther #7
 Cable & Deadpool #17
 Captain America #10
 Excalibur (2004 – 2005 series) #13–14
 Exiles #69–71
 Giant Size: Ms. Marvel #1
 House of M #1–8
 House of M: Avengers #1–5
 House of M: Fantastic Four #1–3
 House of M: Iron Man #1–3
 House of M: Masters of Evil #1–4
 House of M: Spider-Man #1–5
 House of M: Civil War #1–5
 House of M: Sketchbook
 Incredible Hulk #83–86
 Mutopia X #1–4 (of 5)
 New Thunderbolts #11
 New X-Men: Academy X #16–19
 The Pulse #10
 "Punyville" (a short piece from Hulk: Broken Worlds #1)
 Uncanny X-Men #462–465
 Wolverine #33–35

Collected editions

Trade paperbacks
The trade paperbacks collect many of the issues involved with the House of M storyline. Arranged in order, the spines of the books form the House of M logo. Each storyline/paperback contains a mostly standalone side story and can be read individually without any continuity problems. Only the House of M miniseries itself deals with the main storyline.

Hardcovers

Spin-offs

Other versions
An issue of What If? using the "House of M" as a springboard asks, "What If Scarlet Witch Ended the House of M event by saying No More Powers?" In this story, all of the heroes of the world lose their powers with mixed results. Characters like Thing, Ms. Marvel and She-Hulk revert to human form, Doctor Strange tells Wong that he cannot connect with magic, Wolverine's adamantium skeleton becomes too heavy for him to bear, Spider-Man is relieved at the loss of his "responsibility", etc. Iron Man believes there is still work to be done and most of the X-Men try to resume normal lives. Iron Man speaks to the Illuminati members about this problem. Red Skull obtains a Cosmic Cube and uses it to take over New York, with the intent to do the same to the planet. Iron Man outfits Wolverine, War Machine, and Carol Danvers with special armored suits. The X-Men appear, using remaining Shi'ar technology in an attempt to stop Red Skull. As a result of this opposition, the Cosmic Cube is destroyed, and the Red Skull is defeated. Many years later, an older Tony Stark is shown visiting Peter Parker, his daughter May and May's young daughter Anna. Stark speculates that if things get bad enough again, superhuman abilities may yet emerge. As he says this, Anna is shown leaping from a monkey bar after a butterfly with uncanny grace and agility.

Two issues of What If? in the 2009 series revolve around the Spider-Man: House of M miniseries. The first one asks what would have happened had Emma Frost not wiped Gwen's mind and she had accompanied the heroes to Genosha. The second one asks what would have happened if the Scarlet Witch had allowed Gwen and her son with Peter to exist after returning reality back to normal.

In other media 
The Marvel Cinematic Universe miniseries WandaVision is inspired by the House of M storyline, in which Wanda Maximoff creates an alternate reality after Vision's death, though she only affects one town, Westview instead of the whole world. Her children also appear in the series as well as Doctor Strange in the Multiverse of Madness.

See also
 Marvel Comics multiverse

References

External links
 
 
 
 House of M at Marvel.com
 Interview with Bendis on House of M at Comic Book Resources
 Tom Brevoort on House of M at Newsarama
 Tom Brevoort on the House of M tie-ins at Newsarama
 Bendis talks about House of M Postmortem, Part 1 and Part 2 at Newsarama

 Comics by Brian Michael Bendis
 Comics set in New York City
 Marvel Comics dimensions
 Scarlet Witch
 X-Men storylines
2005 comics endings